The Tel Aviv Performing Arts Center (TAPAC) or The Golda Center for Performing Arts is a performing arts center at King Saul Boulevard in  Tel Aviv, Israel. It was designed by Israeli architect Yaakov Rechter.

Opened to the public in 1994, the center is home to the Israeli Opera, and the Cameri Theater, welcoming about a million visitors annually. The complex is adjacent to Beit Ariela (the Central Municipal Library) and the Tel Aviv Museum of Art, with Dubnow Park lying at the back of the center.

The center hosts a variety of performances including dance, classical music, opera and jazz, as well as fine arts exhibitions.

References

External links

Buildings and structures in Tel Aviv
Culture in Tel Aviv
Tourist attractions in Tel Aviv
Concert halls in Israel
1994 establishments in Israel
Opera houses in Israel
Yaakov Rechter buildings